The canton of Freyming-Merlebach is an administrative division of the Moselle department, northeastern France. Its borders were modified at the French canton reorganisation which came into effect in March 2015. Its seat is in Freyming-Merlebach.

It consists of the following communes:
 
Barst
Béning-lès-Saint-Avold
Betting
Cappel
Farébersviller
Freyming-Merlebach
Guenviller
Henriville
Hombourg-Haut
Hoste
Seingbouse

References

Cantons of Moselle (department)